Evening Prayer refers to:
 Evening Prayer (Anglican), an Anglican liturgical service which takes place after midday, generally late afternoon or evening.   When significant components of the liturgy are sung, the service is referred to as "Evensong".

"Evening prayer" may also refer to:
 Ma'ariv, the evening prayer in Judaism. See Jewish services 
 Maghrib, the obligatory prayer in Islam offered in the evening
 Vespers, the Roman Catholic service of evening prayer

Art
 Evening prayer, a painting by Anna Ancher

Music
"Evening Prayer", List of compositions by Modest Mussorgsky
"Evening prayer"  Folksongs (Alfred Deller album)